Granger-Hunter was a census-designated place in Salt Lake County, Utah, USA, during the 1970 United States Census. which comprises the communities of Granger and Hunter. The population in 1970 was 9,029. The census area, along with the neighboring community of Redwood, became part of the newly created West Valley City in 1980. The ZIP code serving the area is 84119.

Geography
Located at 40.706543 north and 111.978487 west, the census area of Granger-Hunter was located southwest of Salt Lake City, northeast of Kearns and east of Magna.  The land area of the CDP was 1.2 square miles and a housing unit count of 2,101.

References

External links
Granger-Hunter Improvement District
View of Granger-Hunter area from Topographic Maps.

 
Former census-designated places in Utah
1980 disestablishments in Utah
Former populated places in Salt Lake County, Utah